The Ministry of Environment, Science, Technology and Innovation is the ministry of Ghana responsible for the development of environment and science in the country.

Vision 
The ministry conceives of maintaining development through the use of science, technology and innovation for economic growth and healthy external conditions through advanced and a well-structured economy.

Mission 
The purpose of this ministry is to sustain growth by putting up measures to strengthen market aimed research and development (R&D) for appropriate external conditions, science, technology and innovation through massive cognizance conception, partnership and team work.

Agencies 
 Council for Scientific and Industrial Research
 Ghana Atomic Energy Commission
 Environmental Protection Agency
 Land Use & Spatial Planning Authority
 National Biosafety Authority
 Nuclear Regulatory Authority, Ghana

Objectives

 The intensification of the application of safe and sound environmental practices;
 The development and promotion of a science and technology culture at all levels of society.
 The development of the sector's institutionalized delivery capacities in human resource management, infrastructure and plant/equipment through appropriate policies and legislation.
 The promotion of public demand for science and technology  products and services;
 The encouragement and strengthening of compliance of  human settlements standards in communities;
 The strengthening of linkages with local and international collaborating agencies;
 The promotion, co-ordination  and evaluation of research and development activities;

Functions 
 Encourage actions required to support the measures and policies needed for projecting and carrying out sound scientific and technological development actions;
 Ascertain the classification, monitoring, rating and to supervise the activities of Environment, Science, Technology and Innovation while seeing to the economic benefits.
 Ensure appropriate and efficient environmental direction and administration.
 Ensure the appropriate management of all planned programs and see to budgets in the area of environment, science, technology and innovation sector of the economy for aims of attaining a unified management system.

References

External links 
 
 Council for Scientific and Industrial Research – Ghana
 Ghana Atomic Energy Commission
 Ghana Environmental Protection Agency

Environment, Science, Technology and Innovation
Ghana, Environment, Science, Technology and Innovation
Environment of Ghana
Ghana, Environment, Science, Technology and Innovation